The 1995 Australian motorcycle Grand Prix was the first round of the 1995 Grand Prix motorcycle racing season. It took place on 26 March 1995 at Eastern Creek Raceway.

500 cc classification

250 cc classification

125 cc classification

References

Australian motorcycle Grand Prix
Australian
Motorcycle
Motorsport at Eastern Creek Raceway